Yi Min “Mike” Xie is a Distinguished Professor and Director of the CISM Centre for Innovative Structures and Materials Team within School of Engineering at RMIT University.

Early life and education 
Xie was born in China and attended Shanghai Jiao Tong University obtaining his Bachelor's degree in Engineering Mechanics. Later he studied at Swansea University and received a PhD degree in Computational Mechanics.

Career 

Xie came to Australia and joined the University of Sydney in the 1990's where he carried out research on the Evolutionary Structural Optimization (ESO) method which has become a popular method used in topology optimization. He was appointed a Lecturer at Victoria University promoted to Senior Lecturer, then Associate Professor and eventually Professor. He moved to RMIT University in the early 2000's as Professor and Head of Civil & Infrastructure engineering for the coming years.

Honours 
 He was elected a Fellow of the Australian Academy of Technology and Engineering in 2011.
 In 2017, he received the Clunies-Ross Award from the Australian Academy of Technology and Engineering. In the same year, he was awarded the AGM Michell Medal by Engineers Australia.
He was awarded the Australian Laureate Fellowship in 2019 by the Australian Research Council.
In the 2019 Queen's Birthday Honours List, he was appointed a Member of the Order of Australia (AM), for "significant service to higher education, and to civil engineering".
He was awarded the Victoria Prize for Science and Innovation in 2020.

References 

1963 births
Living people
Shanghai Jiao Tong University alumni
Alumni of Swansea University
Members of the Order of Australia
Engineers from Jiangsu
Academic staff of RMIT University